The Sulawesi harpy fruit bat (Harpyionycteris celebensis) is a species of megabat in the family Pteropodidae. It is endemic to Indonesia where it is found in Sulawesi and in Soloi on Buton island.

References

External links
 Photos 

Harpyionycteris
Bats of Indonesia
Endemic fauna of Indonesia
Mammals of Sulawesi
Taxa named by Ned Hollister
Taxa named by Gerrit Smith Miller Jr.
Mammals described in 1921